John R. Halstead was inaugurated on April 7, 2006, as SUNY Brockport's sixth president. He has a wife and daughter. He retired in 2015 and was succeeded by Heidi Macpherson.

Education 
 Post-Doctoral - Harvard University, 1990.
 Ph.D. - Ohio State University, 1980.
 M.A. - Michigan State University, 1972.
 B.A. - Colgate University, 1970.

References

External links 
SUNY Brockport's Office of the President

 after = Heidi McPherson

Colgate University alumni
Harvard University alumni
Living people
Michigan State University alumni
Ohio State University alumni
Presidents of campuses of the State University of New York
Year of birth missing (living people)